Fer Rivero is a singer, songwriter and music producer certified in marketing by The University of Oxford and Saiid Business School, known in the past for his career as a  professional dancer, gymnast, teacher and choreographer, born and raised in Granada, Spain. He began his training singing at the school choir at ten years old, to later begin his acrobatic gymnastics career with 12 y.o. at Club Acrobatos Granada. As a gymnast, he achieved the Spanish National Champion 4 years consecutively, 2nd classified internationally, and in 2008, at 16 years old, he became 5th of the World at Glasgow's Acrobatic Gymnastics World Championships organised by the FIG.

As a dancer, Fer appeared in several dance TV programs in Spain and the UK ending 4th classified in “Fama, ¡A Bailar!” Season 5 and inside the top 50 in So You Think You Can Dance Series 2. He was guided into dancing by Alicia Saray Frias, choreographer of the Australian National Ballet and the Italian Theater Director Ennio Trinelli, whose company hired him to choreograph two of their biggest festivals; The Walk and Mozart: The Theater Tale).

For four years, Fer lived and worked in China for multiple dance companies and studios in the Guizhou and Guangdong Provinces before moving to Hong Kong for another four years to work full-time as a choreographer for the dance studio Red Shoe Dance. During his last years in Asia he developed his marketing skills and created his current company "Galeorithm Agency" AKA "The Algorithm Agency".

Recognition
Fer Rivero is rated by ANR saying that he is going to be the next R&B Pop icon of the world after Fer has released his single "Tinder Love" said to be the ability of the creation of captivatingly fluid soundscapes. 
Recognised by Yahoo! Finance as a multitasker with an all-time high career, who successfully juggles his time between creating and editing music, digital marketing, choreographing, graphic design and the Director of a Marketing Agency called Galeorithm Agency.

Songs

References

External links
 FerRivero
 FerRiveroMusic

1992 births
Living people
Alumni of the University of Oxford
Alumni of Saïd Business School
Spanish gymnasts
Spanish comedians
Spanish male dancers
Spanish male singer-songwriters
People from Granada